Ralph Freeman (died 16 March 1634) was an English merchant  who was Lord Mayor of London in 1633.

Freeman was a city of London merchant and a member of the Worshipful Company of Clothworkers. He was on the committee of the East India Company  from 1608 to 1611 and from 1612 to 1615. From 1613 to 1615 he was an auditor of the City and served as one of the Court of Assistants of the Levant Company from 1614 to 1615 and from 1616 to 1623. He was a member of the committee of the East India Company from 1617 to 1619. In 1620 he was elected Sheriff of London but did not serve immediately. He was also Master of the Clothworkers Company in 1620 and on the committee of the East India Company from 1622 to 1623. On 12 November 1622, he was elected an alderman of the City of London for Bishopsgate ward. He was Sheriff of London from 1623 to 1624. In 1633 he became alderman for Cornhill ward and in 1633, he was elected Lord Mayor of London.

Freeman married Jane Crouch, daughter of John Crouch of Layston. They had a numerous family of whom three reached adulthood. Their daughter Jane married George Sondes, 1st Earl of Feversham. She died in about 1636, leaving two sons, George and Freeman. Tragedy struck the family in 1655 when Freeman, then a youth of eighteen or nineteen, murdered George, apparently simply out of jealousy, and was hanged for the murder.

Sir Ralph was Lord of the Manor of Aspenden, Hertfordshire.

References

Year of birth missing
1634 deaths
17th-century lord mayors of London
English merchants
Sheriffs of the City of London